Carex secta is a sedge endemic to New Zealand. The Māori name is makura amongst others, and it was given the name niggerhead by early European settlers, but that has fallen out of use because of its racist denotation. It grows in wetlands.

Gallery

References

secta
Endemic flora of New Zealand
Flora of New Zealand
Plants described in 1853
Taxa named by Francis Boott